Tony Murphy may refer to:

 Tony Murphy (baseball) (1859–1915), American Association catcher
 Tony Murphy (basketball) (born 1957), retired American basketball player
 Tony Murphy (cricketer) (born 1962), former English cricketer
 Tony Murphy (footballer) (born 1940), former Australian rules footballer

See also
Anthony Murphy (disambiguation)